USS England (DE-635), a  of the United States Navy, was named in honor of Ensign John C. England (1920–1941), who was killed in action aboard the battleship  during the Japanese attack on Pearl Harbor on 7 December 1941. Her sinking of six Japanese submarines in twelve days is a feat unparalleled in the history of antisubmarine warfare.

Construction and commissioning
England was launched on 26 September 1943 at the Bethlehem Shipbuilding Corporation shipyard in San Francisco, California, sponsored by Mrs. H. B. England, mother of Ensign England; and commissioned on 10 December 1943.

Operational history
England arrived at Espiritu Santo on 12 March 1944 from San Francisco, Pearl Harbor, Funafuti, and Guadalcanal. She took up escort duty between Espiritu Santo and Guadalcanal, occasionally sailing to Nouméa, and once to the Marshalls.

Anti-submarine record

I-16 
Fleet Radio Unit Pacific (FRUPAC) intercepted and decoded a 13 May 1944 message from  including a scheduled delivery of rice for Japanese troops at Buin on the southern tip of Bougainville Island. Escort Division 39 (Cdr H. Plains commanding), comprising  and  along with England of Escort Division 40, were ordered to intercept I-16 and departed Purvis Bay on the afternoon of 18 May 1944. On the morning of 19 May, an American patrol aircraft spotted I-16 on the surface and made a contact report. Alerted, England, Raby and George conducted a line-abreast sonar sweep. At 13:35, England detected I-16 with sonar. A third Hedgehog attack at 14:10 missed because depth was assumed to be  rather than the  revealed by the fathometer following the attack. I-16 outmaneuvered a fourth Hedgehog attack. The fifth Hedgehog attack at 14:33 resulted in four to six detonations and was followed by a large underwater explosion which lifted Englands fantail and knocked men off their feet. Debris began floating to the surface twenty minutes later and the following day there was a  oil slick.

 Ro-106 
A 20 May 1944 message was decoded revealing Japanese plans for a submarine trap north of the Admiralty Islands to intercept an anticipated movement of United States aircraft carriers. George detected Ro-106 on radar at 03:50 on 22 May, saw the submarine dive when located by searchlight, and missed with a Hedgehog attack at 04:15. England regained contact at 04:25, missed with one Hedgehog attack, and scored at least three detonations on a second attack at 05:01. A large underwater explosion was detected as England prepared to conduct a third attack, and a heavy oil slick with debris was evident after sunrise.

 Ro-104 
The three destroyer escorts formed a search line with a scouting interval of 16,000 yards during hours of darkness. Raby detected  on radar at 06:00 on 23 May, made sonar contact at 06:10 but missed with four Hedgehog attacks beginning at 06:17.  George missed with another Hedgehog attack at 07:17, then missed with another four more Hedgehog attacks between 07:30 and 08:10.  England missed with a first Hedgehog attack and scored an estimated ten or twelve detonations on a second Hedgehog attack at 08:34.  The hits were followed by noises of the submarine breaking up and a large underwater explosion three minutes later.  Debris and oil appeared on the surface at 10:45.

 Ro-116 
George detected  on radar at 01:20 24 May.  England made sonar contact at 01:50 and scored three to five detonations on the first Hedgehog attack at 02:14.  Breaking-up noises were not followed by the major explosions noted on earlier sinkings.  A small quantity of oil and debris was evident after sunrise at 07:02 and the oil slick had expanded to cover several square miles the following day.  On 25 June 1944, the Imperial Japanese Navy declared Ro-116 to be lost north of the Admiralty Islands with all 56 crew.

 Ro-108 
The destroyer escorts maintained their search formation en route to Manus. Raby detected  on radar at 23:03 26 May. England made radar contact at 23:04, sonar contact at 23:18, and scored four to six detonations with the first Hedgehog attack. There was no major explosion following the breaking-up noises, but a fountain of oil was observed rising to the surface at dawn.

 Ro-105 
The three destroyer escorts reached Manus at 1500 on 27 May. Hazelwood detected  on radar at 01:56 on 30 May and missed with a depth charge attack. George and Raby joined Hazelwood and made a total of sixteen Hedgehog and depth charge attacks over a period of 25 hours. RO-105 surfaced at 03:10 on 31 May and was immediately detected by George and Raby. RO-105 stayed directly between the two destroyer escorts for five minutes before submerging so neither Raby nor George could fire without endangering the other. Sequential Hedgehog attacks were then made by Raby, George, Raby, and Spangler. All missed. Division Commander Hains then radioed, "Oh, hell. Go ahead, England." England then scored six to ten detonations in a Hedgehog attack at 07:36. A major explosion followed at 07:41 and oil and debris appeared on the surface.

This anti-submarine warfare performance was never matched in World War II and won for England a Presidential Unit Citation and the assurance from the Chief of Naval Operations, Admiral E. J. King, "There'll always be an England in the United States Navy." His pledge was fulfilled on 6 October 1960, when DLG-22''' was assigned the name England.

 Subsequent service 
Through the summer of 1944, England sailed throughout the northern Solomons, providing the escort services necessary for the building up of bases, preparations for the renewed assaults on Japanese territories to the north, and provision of supplies to garrison forces on the islands of the southwest Pacific.  In August, she underwent repairs at Manus, and between 24 September and 15 October voyaged from the Treasury Islands to Sydney, Australia.  From the Treasuries, she sailed guarding a convoy to Hollandia, where she arrived on 18 October, and on the 26th got underway on the first of two voyages to escort reinforcement convoys to newly invaded Leyte. She returned to Manus and local escort duty on 2 December.

From 2 January 1945, England escorted convoys between Manus and Ulithi, the major base for operations of the carrier task forces, and later to be the staging point for the assaults on Iwo Jima and Okinawa. The escort vessel sailed to Kossol Roads in February, bringing in a convoy later routed on to the Philippines, then resumed her duty on the Manus-Ulithi sea lanes. She sailed from Ulithi on 23 March, as part of Task Force 54 (TF 54), for the pre-invasion bombardment of Okinawa, returned to Ulithi to join the screen of two cruisers, guarding them back to Okinawa to join the 5th Fleet just after the initial assault on 1 April. Between 6 and 17 April, she voyaged to Saipan screening unladen transports, then took up a screening and patrol station north of the Kerama Retto.

On 9 May 1945, while on station, England was attacked by three Japanese dive bombers.  Her anti-aircraft fire set the first of these aflame, but the plane crashed into England on her starboard side, just below the bridge. When the planes bomb exploded just after the crash, Englands men began a dangerous race against time to quench the fires and save their ship, while the combat air patrol shot down the two other aircraft. England was able to make Kerama Retto under tow, with 37 of her men killed or missing and 25 wounded.England'' sailed on to Leyte, where she received temporary repairs to put her in shape for the long voyage home.  On 16 July 1945 she arrived at Philadelphia for permanent repairs and conversion to a High-speed transport.  The end of the war, however, halted this work.  Because of her extensive damage and a surplus of ships of her type, it was decided not to repair her.  She was decommissioned on 15 October 1945 and sold for scrapping on 26 November 1946.

Awards

Presidential Unit Citation
Asiatic-Pacific Campaign Medal with 10 battle stars 
World War II Victory Medal

Notes

References 

 Lanier, William D. and Williamson, John A., Capt USN "The Twelve Days of the England" United States Naval Institute Proceedings March 1980

External links  
 USS England website
 
 Roll of Honor

Buckley-class destroyer escorts
World War II frigates and destroyer escorts of the United States
Ships built in San Francisco
1943 ships
Maritime incidents in May 1945